F88 or F-88 may refer to:
 F88 Austeyr, an Australian variant of the Steyr AUG rifle
 HMS Broadsword (F88), a 1976 British Royal Navy Type 22 frigate
 HMS Malcolm (F88), a 1955 British Royal Navy Blackwood-class anti-submarine frigate
 Volvo F88, a 1968 truck
 McDonnell XF-88 Voodoo, a 1948 experimental US jet fighter
 Route F88 (Iceland), a highland road in Iceland
 Oldsmobile F-88, a dream car produced by General Motors in the 1950s